Shadowzone or shadow zone may refer to:

 Shadow zone, an area in which a secondary seismic wave is not detected due to it not being able to pass through the core of the earth
 Shadow Zone (Static-X album), the third album by the band Static-X
 Shadow Zone (Axel Rudi Pell album), the ninth studio album released by guitarist Axel Rudi Pell
 Oxygen minimum zone, the zone in which oxygen saturation in seawater in the ocean is at its lowest
 Shadowzone (film), a science fiction film
 Shadow Zone (novels), horror novels for kids